Fawcett is an English surname. Notable people with the surname include:

A. Chase Fawcett (1863–1934), Canadian politician.
Benjamin Fawcett (1808–1893), English woodblock colour printer
Brian Fawcett (1944–2022), Canadian poet and novelist
Cesar Fawcett (born 1983), Colombian footballer
Charles Fawcett (historian), British historian
Charles Bungay Fawcett (1883-1952), British geographer
Charles Fernley Fawcett (1915–2008), U.S. soldier, actor, and co-founder of the International Medical Corps
Charlotte Fawcett (1942—2021), British artist, mother of British Prime Minister Boris Johnson
David Fawcett (born 1963), Australian politician
Edward Douglas Fawcett (1866-1960), English mountaineer, philosopher and novelist
Eric Fawcett (1927–2000), British-Canadian physicist
Farrah Fawcett (1947–2009), U.S. actress
Henry Fawcett (1833–1884), British economist and politician
Jason Spencer Fawcett (1984), English Baronet
 James Farish Malcolm Fawcett (after 1918), English entomologist who specialised in Lepidoptera
Joan Fawcett (1937–2015), Canadian politician
John Fawcett (actor) (1768–1837), English actor and playwright
John Fawcett (of Bolton) (1789–1867), English composer
Joseph Fawcett (1758-1804), English Presbyterian minister and poet
Joy Fawcett (born 1968), American soccer player
Michael Fawcett (1962–), British courtier and very close friend of King Charles III
Millicent Fawcett (1847–1929), British feminist
Nicole Fawcett (born 1986), American volleyball player and coach
Norman Fawcett (1910–1997), Canadian politician
Percy Fawcett (1867–), British archaeologist and explorer
Philippa Fawcett (1868–1948), British mathematician and educator
Quinn Fawcett, pen name of a pair of authors, Chelsea Quinn Yarbro and Bill Fawcett
Ron Fawcett (born 1955), English rock climber
Ruth Fawcett (born 1961), Canadian physicist
Sarah Fawcett, South African oceanographer
Taylor Fawcett (born 1993), British actor
Theodore Fawcett (1832–1898), Australian settler and politician
Wilford Fawcett (1885–1940), American publisher
William Fawcett (disambiguation), several persons with the name

See also
Fawcett (disambiguation)

English-language surnames